The Inner Ring Road refers to one of the two main ring roads, the main inner one and an outer one in Delhi, India. There are two less significant Ring Roads in Delhi apart from the above two, namely the Rural Ring Road, that runs across the rural areas on the fringe of North West Delhi and West Delhi Ring Road, limited only to the West Delhi region.

The road features three lanes in each direction and is currently being widened to four lanes in each direction. It features a few flyover links to the Delhi Outer Ring Road.

The AIIMS-Naraina stretch is in the process of being made signal-free.

Areas on Inner Ring Road
 Shalimar Bagh
 Ashok Vihar
 Keshav Puram/ WazirPur DTC Bus Station/Depot
 Shakurpur Telephone Exchange
 Britannia
 Punjabi Bagh
 ESI - Basaidarapur
 Raja Garden
 Rajouri Garden
 Kirti Nagar - Naraina (Industrial area)
Naraina Village 
 Dhaula Kuan Passage
 Dhaula Kuan complete stretch
 Moti Bagh
 New Moti Bagh
 R K Puram (Sector 12)
 Hyatt Hotel
 Nouroji Nagar/ Sarojini Nagar
 Safdarjung
 A I I M S
 South Extension (1 & 2)
 Andrews Ganj
 Lajpat Nagar
Harinagar ashram
 Nizamuddin
 I P
 Bus Adda (Inter State Bus Terminus)
 I T O
 Timarpur
 Guru Tegh Bahadur Nagar
 Azadpur

Flyovers
Flyovers are present at the following junctions:

 Nizamuddin Xing Bridge
 NOIDA more/ NH24 T-Point Bridge
 Cloverleaves ITO flyover
 Old Hanuman Mandir / Iron Bridge/Old Delhi Xing/ Yamuna Bazar Bridge
 ISBT Kashmere Gate Flyover Complex
 Azadpur bridge
 Shalimar Bagh Flyover
 Wazirpur Bridge
 Prembari chowk Underpass
 Britannia Chowk Flyover
 Punjabi Bagh Flyover
 Moti Nagar Flyover
 Raja Garden/Shivaji Place District Centre Flyover
 Kirti Nagar/ Mayapuri flyover
 Rajput Samrat Anangpal Tanwar Setu Naraina Flyover
 Dhaula kuan
 Motibagh Flyover
 Africa Avenue Flyover
 Sarojini Nagar Flyover (over Shri Vinayaka Mandir Marg)
 AIIMS flyover Complex (over Sri Aurobindo Marg)
 South Extension/ August Kranti Marg/ Bhishm Pitamah Marg Xing
 Defence Colony Underpass below Moolchand Flyover
 Lajpat Nagar flyover
 Nehru Nagar Bridge

Gallery

See also
Outer Ring Road, New Delhi

Roads in Delhi
New Delhi
Ring roads in India